Ek Hindustani is an Indian action film which remains unreleased. The film was directed by Tinnu Anand. It starred Sunil Shetty and Raveena Tandon in lead roles.

Plot
Sunil Srivastava (Sunil Shetty), is the son of a freedom fighter (Pran), who fought against the British regime for Indian independence. His father knew what slavery meant and also made him understand the same. He believed that, "It was better to die than to live as coward". With such intention Sunil comes to bombay from Allahabad to study law, so that he can fight for the justice of the people. But he soon realizes that the law in the city favours the powerful people and the weaker section of the society are the losers. Not being a coward, Sunil decides to take on the system, be it all-alone, and fight them on his own terms. A saviour called "Ek Hindustani" is born which is the name given by the people to Sunil. Suddenly there is revolution in the air. Every child around wants to become "Ek Hindustani" and wants to live without fear. Sunil's dream will come true when every person in the country will stand up and fight against evil, than live life of a coward.

Cast
Sunil Shetty as Sunil Srivastava  
Raveena Tandon
Pran 
Mohan Joshi
Mohnish Bahl
Ashish Vidyarthi
Kulbhushan Kharbanda
Himani Shivpuri
Rakhee Malhotra
Rajendra Gupta
Harish Patel
Mushtaq Khan
Shahbaz Khan 	
Brij Gopal
Veerendra Saxena

Soundtrack
"Mohabbat ko Hum Chhod De" - Udit Narayan, Alka Yagnik
"Aao Mujhe Acche LAgne Lage" - Udit Narayan, Anuradha Paudwal
"Aap Mujhe Acche Lagne Lage (sad)" - Sonu Nigam, Anuradha Paudwal
"Dilruba" - Udit Narayan
"Chori Chori Dil Diya" - Udit Narayan, Alka Yagnik
"Chalo Accha" - Udit Narayan, Kavita Krishnamurthy
"Sonewale Neend Se Jage" - Alka Yagnik, Anand Raj Anand, Sonu Nigam
"Yeh Fauji" - Anand Raj Anand
"Yaaron Ka Dil Todke" - Ram Shankar

References

External links
 
 

2003 films
2000s Hindi-language films
Films scored by Anand Raj Anand